Aaron Daley can refer to:

 Aaron Daley (cricketer, born 1956)
 Aaron Daley (cricketer, born 1989)